Walid Ben Abbes (born ) is a former Tunisian male volleyball player. He was part of the Tunisia men's national volleyball team. He competed with the national team at the 2004 Summer Olympics in Athens, Greece. On club level he played for E.S.Sahel, TUN.

See also
 Tunisia at the 2004 Summer Olympics

References

External links
 profile at FIVB.org

1980 births
Living people
Tunisian men's volleyball players
Volleyball players at the 2004 Summer Olympics
Olympic volleyball players of Tunisia
Place of birth missing (living people)